Kaiyuan Finance Center is a 53-story,  skyscraper built in 2012 in Shijiazhuang, Hebei, China. The building is located in the central business district of Shijiazhuang, and as of January 2020, it's the tallest in the city.

Designed by International and developed by Fincera Inc., an e-commerce company serving small and medium-sized Chinese businesses, the building serves as the company's headquarter. It's also home to Hilton Shijiazhuang. A mixed-use building, 20 of the building's floors consist of hotel rooms while 21 floors are office space.

Tenants
Floors 1–4 consist of lobbies, restaurants, and meeting rooms. Floors 5 through 27 are office space. The sky lobby occupies the 29th to the 31st floor. Floors 32–53 belongs to Hilton Shijiazhuang, the largest tenant of the building.  Maintenance levels occupy floors 12, 28, and 40.

See also
List of tallest buildings in Shijiazhuang

References

Buildings and structures in Hebei
Buildings and structures in Shijiazhuang